Barbara Love (1937-2022)  an American feminist writer, editor, and activist.

Barbara Love may also refer to:

 Barbara J. Love, activist with United to End Racism
 Barbara Jean Love, singer and member of The Friends of Distinction